Nuckolls may refer to:

Places
Nuckolls, West Virginia
Nuckolls County, Nebraska

People with the surname
William T. Nuckolls (1801–1855), American politician
Stephen Friel Nuckolls (1825–1879), American politician